= Arne Vidstrom =

American computer security specialist

Arne Vidstrom is a Microsoft Windows security expert. He is noted for discovering a number of Windows security vulnerabilities, as well as, for developing the Wups toolkit, "arguably the best freeware UDP scanner for NT".

== See also ==
- Computer Security
- Computer Operating System
